Jim Rigsby (June 6, 1923 – August 31, 1952) was an American racecar driver from Spadry, Arkansas. He was killed in a crash during a sprint car race at Dayton, Ohio.

Indy 500 results

World Championship career summary
The Indianapolis 500 was part of the FIA World Championship from 1950 through 1960. Drivers competing at Indy during those years were credited with World Championship points and participation. Jim Rigsby participated in 1 World Championship race but scored no World Championship points.

1923 births
1952 deaths
Indianapolis 500 drivers
Racing drivers who died while racing
Sports deaths in Ohio
Racing drivers from Arkansas
AAA Championship Car drivers